GROOVEssentials Volume One is a Canadian R&B compilation album, released in 1997 on Beat Factory Music, and distributed by BMG Music Canada. Three songs from the album—"The Thing to Do" by Glenn Lewis, "Don't Leave Me Hangin" by Camille Douglas, and "How May I Do U" by Unique, were nominated for Best R&B/Soul Recording at the 1998 Juno Awards, while the song "I Just Want To Be Your Everything" by The McAuley Boys was released on the 1997 Juno Awards nominated album In Another Lifetime in the same category.

Track listing

External links
Album credits at Discogs
Canadian Music Week 2004
About Ivan Berry

1997 compilation albums
Albums produced by K-Cut (producer)
Bertelsmann Music Group compilation albums
Compilation albums by Canadian artists
Contemporary R&B compilation albums